Menston is a village and civil parish in the City of Bradford in the county of West Yorkshire, England.  Along with Burley in Wharfedale, most of Menston is within Wharfedale Ward in the metropolitan borough of Bradford. The remainder of Menston is in the Leeds City Council area. At the 2011 census it has a population of 4,498 (down from 4,660 in 2001).

Landmarks
Menston's Anglican parish church is dedicated to St John the Divine, and is part of the Diocese of Leeds. Other notable buildings include the former High Royds Hospital and St. Mary's Menston Catholic Academy, both of which are in the Leeds part of Menston.

The site of High Royds Hospital, originally the West Riding Pauper Lunatic Asylum, which is just inside the City of Leeds metropolitan borough, has been converted to housing called "Highroyds Village". This is a reflection of Menston's growing size. In the past 20 years there has been increased demand for much needed housing in the area. The population of Menston has been steadily increasing. As a result, Menston Primary School, which was threatened with closure in the 1980s, has increased student numbers.

Transport
It lies on the A65, approximately ten miles north-west of the centre of Leeds and 9 miles north of Bradford centre, between Guiseley and Burley-in-Wharfedale.  Menston also has a railway station between Guiseley and Burley on the Wharfedale Line, with direct trains to Leeds, Bradford Forster Square and Ilkley.  There are bus services to Leeds, Otley and Wetherby (an infrequent bus service run by Utopia).  Menston once had rail links to Otley, via the (now closed) Arthington to Menston Line.

Cultural references
Highroyds is mentioned in the Kaiser Chiefs song of the same name, from the album, Yours Truly Angry Mob. The Kaiser Chiefs met and formed in the same class at St Mary's Catholic High School, now St. Mary's Menston.

Gallery

Sport

Menston is home to football club, Menston Town FC who currently play in the Wharfedale Triangle Division 2 after being established in 2010.

Menston cricket club, which plays at the Fox Ground. Offering 1st, 2nd and 3rd team seniors men  cricket, has recently merged with CromPark adding two more Saturday 1st and 2nd senior men's teams to the rosta. The club boasts a large junior section which contributed 16 teams (from U18 - U9) to the AWJCL.

Menston Cricket Club is an active promoter of girls and women's participation in cricket. With 2 all girls teams, and a women's team flying high in the inaugural women's cricket league.

Home also to Menston Juniors Football Club (MJFC).

Notable residents

Paul Jewell, a retired footballer and the former manager of Bradford City, Sheffield Wednesday, Wigan Athletic and most recently Ipswich Town, has lived in the village since the 1990s. Dean Windass, the former Bradford City and Hull City footballer, lives in the village. Nick Hodgson, Nick Baines and Simon Rix, all members of the rock band, the Kaiser Chiefs, met while attending St. Mary's Roman Catholic High School in Menston. Born in Menston were: Smith Wigglesworth, a notable early Pentecostal preacher (1859); Eric Knight, the author who created the fictional collie, Lassie (1897); Annie Margaret Barr, a Unitarian minister and founder of the Kharang Rural Centre in the Khasi Hills, North East India (1899); and actor Sam Riley (1980).
Bill Bowes (25 July 1908 – 4 September 1987) English professional cricketer active from 1929 to 1947

See also
Listed buildings in Menston

References

External links

 Menston Village
 'Alternative' Menston website
 
 St. Mary's Menston Catholic Voluntary Academy
 St John's church, Menston
 Menston information from local councillor Matt Palmer
 Menston Town FC

 
Villages in West Yorkshire
Wharfedale
Geography of the City of Bradford
Civil parishes in West Yorkshire